Ileen Getz (August 7, 1961 – August 4, 2005) was an American actress, most recognized for her role as Dr. Judith Draper in the television series 3rd Rock from the Sun.

Professional life
Getz began working professionally at The Practical Theatre Company while still in college. After graduating from Northwestern University, she became a company member of the Econo-Art Theatre Company, and worked in other Chicago, Illinois, theaters.

She began her television work in 1995, with appearances on shows such as Law & Order and Seinfeld. In 1996, Getz became a recurring cast member on 3rd Rock from the Sun, playing a professor of women's studies with no personality. Her film career included minor roles in such films as Celebrity, Lovely and Amazing, The Station Agent, Changing Lanes, and the posthumously-released Friends with Money and East Broadway.

Getz also worked in New York City theatre, on Broadway (Jake's Women), and at Lincoln Center, as well as the Manhattan Theatre Club, at which she starred in Night and Her Stars, written by Richard Greenberg. Greenberg later wrote a lead role for her in Hurrah at Last which premiered at South Coast Repertory in 1998.

Death
Getz died of complications from ovarian cancer at the age of 43 on August 4, 2005, in New York City.

References

External links

1961 births
2005 deaths
Actresses from Chicago
American film actresses
American stage actresses
American television actresses
Deaths from cancer in New York (state)
Northwestern University School of Communication alumni
People from Bristol, Pennsylvania
20th-century American actresses
21st-century American women